Bobovišta  is a village in the municipality of Ravno, Bosnia and Herzegovina. Prior the war in Bosnia and Herzegovina it belonged to Trebinje municipality.

Demographics 
According to the 2013 census, its population was 31.

References

Populated places in Ravno, Bosnia and Herzegovina
Serb communities in the Federation of Bosnia and Herzegovina